The 1847 New York state election was held on November 2, 1847, to elect the lieutenant governor, the secretary state, the state comptroller, the attorney general, the state treasurer, the state engineer, three Canal Commissioners and three Inspectors of State Prisons, as well as all members of the New York State Assembly and the New York State Senate.

History
The New York State Constitution of 1846 legislated the incumbent state officers and members of legislature out of office. It required a number of state officers, who had been elected by the state legislature, to be elected by general ballot. 

At the first judicial election under the Constitution of 1846, Lieutenant Governor Addison Gardiner was elected to the New York Court of Appeals, and took office on July 4, 1847, thus vacating the lieutenant governorship. To fill the vacancy, on September 27, an Act by the state legislature authorized a special election, to be held at the annual state election.

The Democratic state convention met in September in Syracuse, New York. The party split over the slavery question, and the Barnburners abandoned the convention. Orville Hungerford defeated Azariah C. Flagg for the nomination for Comptroller with 59 votes to 47. 

The Barnburners held a separate state convention on October 26 at Herkimer, New York, but did not nominate a ticket. They told their followers "to vote as they must do when no regular nominations have been made," suggesting to support the Whig nominees rather than the Hunkers on the Democratic ticket.

The Anti-Rent state convention nominated Shepard for Lieutenant Governor with 11 votes for him, and 10 for Fish, on the second ballot.

Results
The whole Whig state ticket was elected. None of the incumbents ran for re-election this time.

The Canal Commissioners and Prison Inspectors, upon taking office, were classified by drawing lots, so that every following year one commissioner and one inspector would be elected to a three-year term. Cook and Gedney drew the one-year term, Hinds and Comstock the two-year term, and Beach and Spencer the three-year term.

24 Whigs and 8 Democrats were elected to a two-year term (1848–1849) in the New York State Senate.

93 Whigs and 35 Democrats were elected to the New York State Assembly of the 71st New York State Legislature.

Notes

Sources
Result for Lt. Gov. in Manual of the Corporation of the City of New York, 1852, p. 367)
Results in The Whig Almanac and United States Register 1848

See also
New York gubernatorial elections
New York state elections 

1847
 
New York